The Institute of Engineering & Technology, DAVV commonly referred to as IET, or IET DAVV is the engineering school of Devi Ahilya Vishwavidyalaya. It was founded as an autonomous institute in 1996. The college follows a self-financed model. The college is located near the university's Takshashila Campus on Khandwa Road in the south-east of Indore, Madhya Pradesh, India. It is an approved Institution by All India Council for Technical Education (AICTE), New Delhi, Government of Madhya Pradesh and University Grants Commission (UGC). Before the establishment of the permanent campus of IIT Indore at Simrol, IET DAVV was used as the temporary campus for the future institute of national importance in the year 2009–10.

Academics 

The institute offers various B.E. and M.E. programmes.

E-Cell IET DAVV 
E-Cell is the most active student body in IET DAVV and has won several accolades for the institute. 
The E-Cell team  under the leadership of their President, Gourav Thadhani, won the National Entrepreneurship Challenge 2021-22 organized by IIT Bombay and emerged AIR 1 while competing against 500+ premiere institutes of India and remained at the Top of the leaderboards in the 6 month long competition.

The Entreprenership Cell with the motto of Think. Feel. Collaborate. organises various flagship events, competitions and sessions for the students. Currently it works on 2 fronts the Entrepreneurship & Innovation part and the Technical part under the name of Tech Club, IET DAVV.
The E-Cell functions under the Incubation Center ACIIE under the guidance of Dr. Shashi Prakash.

Aakshank 
AAKSHANK is an annual cultural festival on campus.

Invento 
Invento is the annual technical festival of the Institute Of Engineering And Technology, DAVV which is held in August and September. It is organized by the students and the members of IET DAVV. Invento is a two-day event on the campus with workshops, competitions, lectures, conferences, exhibitions, performances and various other events.

Former to Invento, Phoenix was the annual technological festival organized by the IET DAVV in 2009–2011.

See also
 Shri Govindram Seksaria Institute of Technology and Science

References

Universities and colleges in Indore
Science and technology in Indore
Engineering colleges in Madhya Pradesh
Buildings and structures in Indore